Morgan Cephas  is an American politician serving as a member of the Pennsylvania House of Representatives, representing the 192nd House district in Philadelphia, Pennsylvania.

Career
Cephas previously served as the Deputy Chief of Staff to Philadelphia City Councilman Curtis Jones, Jr. before running for the state legislature.

Cephas was first elected to the Pennsylvania House of Representatives in 2016 after defeating incumbent Rep. Lynwood Savage in the Democratic primary. Running unopposed, Cephas was re-elected to a second term in the House in the 2018 general election on November 6, 2018.

Personal life
Cephas was born and raised in West Philadelphia and is a graduate of Central High School. She then graduated with a degree in political science from the University of Virginia.

References

External links
 Web Site

Living people
Central High School (Philadelphia) alumni
University of Virginia alumni
Politicians from Philadelphia
Democratic Party members of the Pennsylvania House of Representatives
21st-century American politicians
Women state legislators in Pennsylvania
Year of birth missing (living people)
21st-century American women politicians